This is a list of the transfers for the 2012–13 I-League season. Additionally, players without a club may join at any time, clubs below I-League level may sign players on loan at any time, and clubs may sign a goalkeeper on an emergency loan if they have no registered goalkeeper available.

Transfers

All clubs without a flag are Indian.

References

Indian
Lists of I-League transfers